editing
JTA may refer to:

 Jacksonville Transportation Authority, the independent agency responsible for public transit in the city of Jacksonville, Florida, and roadway infrastructure that connects northeast Florida
 Jackson Transportation Authority, the former name of the Jackson Area Transportation Authority, the primary provider of mass transportation in Jackson County, Michigan
 Java Transaction API, one of the Java Enterprise Edition (Java EE) APIs, enables distributed transactions to be done across multiple X/Open XA resources in a Java environment
 Java Telephony API, supports telephony call control
 Japan Transocean Air, an airline based in Naha, Okinawa Prefecture, Japan
 Japan Tourism Agency, an organization which was set up on October 1, 2008 as an extra-ministerial bureau of the Ministry of Land, Infrastructure, Transport and Tourism
 Jewish Telegraphic Agency, a US-based international news agency serving Jewish community newspapers and media around the world
 Taylor–Johnson Temperament Analysis, a personality test designed to measure nine common personality traits for the assessment of individual adjustment
 Junction tree algorithm, a method used in machine learning to extract marginalization in general graphs
 Japan Tennis Association, the governing body for professional and amateur tennis in Japan
 Jianquan Taijiquan Association, a well known school teaching Wu-style t'ai chi ch'uan
 Jim Thorpe Association, a civic and charity organization based in Oklahoma City, Oklahoma. It is named in memory of multi-sport legend Jim Thorpe
 Juan Toscano-Anderson, basketball player